Arthur Louis Mergenthal (March 22, 1921 – May 20, 2001) was an American football guard who played two seasons with the Cleveland/Los Angeles Rams of the National Football League (NFL). He played college football at the University of Tennessee, Xavier University, Bowling Green State University and lastly the University of Notre Dame. He first enrolled at Bellevue High School before transferring to St. Xavier High School in Cincinnati, Ohio.

Early years
Mergenthal earned All No. KY, All-Conference and All-State honors in football at Bellevue High School. He also participated in track and field for four years. He was inducted into the Bellevue Athletic Hall of Fame in 2005. Mergenthal graduated from St. Xavier High School in 1939.

College career
Mergenthal first played college football for the Tennessee Volunteers before playing for the Xavier Musketeers, Bowling Green Falcons and lastly the Notre Dame Fighting Irish.

Professional career
Mergenthal played in 19 games, starting three, for the Cleveland/Los Angeles Rams of the NFL from 1945 to 1946. In 1947 the Philadelphia Eagles traded Mel Bleeker to the Rams for Mergenthal.

Personal life
Mergenthal was a principal in the Bellevue School system for over 30 years.

References

External links
Just Sports Stats

1921 births
2001 deaths
Players of American football from Kentucky
American football guards
St. Xavier High School (Ohio) alumni
Tennessee Volunteers football players
Xavier Musketeers football players
Bowling Green Falcons football players
Notre Dame Fighting Irish football players
Cleveland Rams players
Los Angeles Rams players
20th-century American educators
American school administrators
Educators from Kentucky
People from Bellevue, Kentucky